Tang Hon Sing (born 7 October 1977) is a Hong Kong former sprinter. He competed in the men's 4 × 100 metres relay at the 2000 Summer Olympics. He graduated from Beijing Sport University. He formerly held the Hong Kong record for the men's 110 metres hurdles and 400 metres hurdles. He later became an athletics coach.

References

External links
 

1977 births
Living people
Athletes (track and field) at the 2000 Summer Olympics
Beijing Sport University alumni
Hong Kong sports coaches
Hong Kong male sprinters
Olympic athletes of Hong Kong
Place of birth missing (living people)
Athletes (track and field) at the 1998 Asian Games
Athletes (track and field) at the 2002 Asian Games
Athletes (track and field) at the 2006 Asian Games
Asian Games competitors for Hong Kong